Garbo may refer to:

People
Greta Garbo (1905–1990), Swedish actress
Gunnar Garbo (1924–2016), Norwegian journalist and politician
Ingvald Garbo (1891–1941), member of the Norwegian Resistance in WWII 
Norman Garbo (1919–2017), American author, lecturer and painter
Raffaellino del Garbo (1466), Florentine painter
Juan Pujol García (1912–1988), codename "Garbo", Spanish double agent for the British
Garbo (singer) (Renato Abate, born 1958), Italian singer
Greg Garbowsky (born 1986), known as Garbo, American musician

Places
Għarb, Gozo, Malta
Garbo, Tibet

Arts and entertainment
Garbo (film), a 1992 Australian comedy 
Garbo (2005 film), a documentary about Greta Garbo by Kevin Brownlow
Garbo, a fictional character in American TV drama Dirt

Other uses
"Garbo", Australian slang for a waste collector
Garbo (Darawiish), a Darawiish administrative division
Garbo (Puerto Vallarta), a bar in Puerto Vallarta, Mexico

See also